Magic & Mayhem – Tales from the Early Years is a compilation album by the Finnish heavy metal band Amorphis, released on 15 September 2010, in Finland. It's a collection of re-recorded and partially re-arranged songs from their first three studio albums. In addition, the limited edition includes a cover of The Doors song "Light My Fire" as a bonus.

The majority of the vocals are performed by Tomi Joutsen. Vocal performances by Tomi Koivusaari also appear for the first time since 1997.

Track listing

Charts

Credits

Amorphis 
Tomi Joutsen – lead vocals
Esa Holopainen – lead guitar
Tomi Koivusaari – rhythm guitar, backing vocals
Niclas Etelävuori – bass
Santeri Kallio – keyboards
Jan Rechberger – drums

References 

2010 albums
Amorphis albums
Nuclear Blast albums